Chamelania jaliscana is a species of moth of the family Tortricidae. It is found in Jalisco, Mexico.

References

Moths described in 2001
Euliini
Moths of Central America
Taxa named by Józef Razowski